Edwin Essel (born 11 March 2004) is an English professional footballer who plays as a striker for EFL League Two side Grimsby Town.

Career

Grimsby Town
Essel joined the Grimsby Town youth academy at the Under 10's level. He was promoted to the first team by Paul Hurst at the beginning of the 2021–22 season due to a shortage of fit strikers, and made his full professional debut on 4 September 2021 in a 4–3 victory over Barnet, coming on as an 80th minute substitute for Will Bapaga. The following week he came on as an 89th minute replacement for John McAtee in a 3–1 win at Torquay United, later appearing in an FA Cup tie with Bromsgrove Sporting.

Grimsby secured promotion with victory in the play-off final, though Essel was not in the matchday squad at London Stadium.

In April 2022, Essel signed his first professional contract with the club. On 4 October 2022, Essel joined non-league side Grimsby Borough on loan. On 11 January 2023, the loan was extended until the end of the 2022–23 season.

In late January he was recalled due to a player shortage and was named as a substitute in a 2–2 draw away at Luton Town in the fourth round of the FA Cup. On 8 February 2023, Essel made his first appearance of the season as he came on as a late substitute for Danilo Orsi in Grimsby's 3–0 win over Luton in the resulting replay.

Personal life
Essel attended Tollbar Academy in Grimsby.

References

Living people
English footballers
Association football forwards
Grimsby Town F.C. players
Grimsby Borough F.C. players
English Football League players
2004 births